Puerto Rico Highway 198 (PR-198) is a  highway that parallels Puerto Rico Highway 30 from Juncos, Puerto Rico, to Humacao, Puerto Rico, where it ends at Puerto Rico Highway 3. Like Puerto Rico Highway 189, it passes through the business centers of Juncos, Las Piedras and Humacao.

Major intersections

See also

 List of highways numbered 198

References

External links
 

198